Trevor Richard "Titch" Moore (born 18 February 1976) is a South African professional golfer. He currently plays on the Sunshine Tour, where he has won seven times between 2000 and 2007.

Moore was born in Port Elizabeth, South Africa. He turned pro in 1997 and joined the Sunshine Tour in that same year. His best finish on the Order of Merit for the Sunshine Tour came in the 2004–05 season where he finished 4th. He has also played on the European Tour, and the second tier Challenge Tour, where he won the Skandia PGA Open in 2003.

Amateur highlights
1993 World Under 17 Championship, Western Province Amateur Championship, Transvaal Amateur Championship, Eastern Province Amateur Championship
1995 World International Masters
1996 South African International Amateur Championship, South African Amateur Stroke Play Championship

Professional wins (13)

Sunshine Tour wins (10)

Sunshine Tour playoff record (2–3)

Challenge Tour wins (1)

Other wins (2)
2 wins on mini-tours in the United States

External links

South African male golfers
Sunshine Tour golfers
European Tour golfers
Sportspeople from Port Elizabeth
White South African people
1976 births
Living people